French Letter or French letter may refer to:

 French letter or condom, a birth control device
 "French Letter", a song by the New Zealand band Herbs
 Les Lettres Françaises (French for "The French Letters"), a French literary publication

See also
 French orthography, the spelling and punctuation of the French language